Aspe is a town and municipality located in the comarca of Vinalopó Mitjà, in the province of Alicante, Spain.

The town is located in the valley of the river Vinalopó,  from Alicante city. The economy of Aspe is based on textile and footwear industries, as well as farming of vegetables and fruits.

Aspe is also famous for growing a special kind of grape, which is eaten at the stroke of midnight, every New Year's Eve, all across Spain. The grapes are eaten one at a time, according to the clock striking 12, to signal the new year.

Aspe has a small foreign population, mainly Dutch and English. The local Castilian dialect is known for dropping the "s" and seseo.

Aspe has many traditions and during the summer large fiestas take place. Every other year La Virgen De Las Nieves, the patron of the town, comes to Aspe.

Main sights
Historical center (casco antiguo)
Basilica of Nuestra Señora del Socorro (founded in 1602)
Town Hall (17th century)
Castillo del Río, a walled settlement located c.  outside the town
Municipal Historical Museum

Notable people 
 Samu Martínez (born 1994), footballer.
 Alfredo Juan Mayordomo (born 1984), footballer.
 Manuel Castellano Castro (born 1989), footballer.
 Antonio Prieto (1905–1965), character actor.

References

External links 
 Ayuntamiento de Aspe, Town Hall of Aspe (in Spanish).

Municipalities in the Province of Alicante
Vinalopó Mitjà